Viscount Knutsford, of Knutsford in the County Palatine of Chester, is a title in the Peerage of the United Kingdom.

History 

It was created in 1895 for the lawyer, Conservative politician and former Secretary of State for the Colonies, Henry Holland, 1st Baron Knutsford. He had already been created Baron Knutsford, of Knutsford in the County Palatine of Chester, in 1888, also in the Peerage of the United Kingdom. His younger twin son, the third Viscount, assumed in 1876 by Royal licence the additional surname and arms of Hibbert.  the titles are held by the latter's grandson, the sixth Viscount, who succeeded his cousin in 1986.

The Baronetcy, of Sandlebridge in the County Palatine of Chester, was created in the Baronetage of the United Kingdom on 10 May 1853 for the first Viscount's father, the prominent physician and travel writer Henry Holland.

The family seat is Munden House, near Watford, Hertfordshire.

Holland baronets, of Sandlebridge (1853)
Sir Henry Holland, 1st Baronet (1788–1873)
Sir Henry Thurstan Holland, 2nd Baronet (1825–1914) (created Baron Knutsford in 1888 and Viscount Knutsford in 1895)

Viscounts Knutsford (1895)
Henry Thurstan Holland, 1st Viscount Knutsford (1825–1914)
Sydney George Holland, 2nd Viscount Knutsford (1855–1931)
Arthur Henry Holland-Hibbert, 3rd Viscount Knutsford (1855–1935)
Thurstan Holland-Hibbert, 4th Viscount Knutsford (1888–1976)
Julian Thurstan Holland-Hibbert, 5th Viscount Knutsford (1920–1986)
Michael Holland-Hibbert, 6th Viscount Knutsford (born 1926)

The heir apparent is the present holder's son the Hon. Henry Thurstan Holland-Hibbert (born 1959)
The heir apparent's heir apparent is his elder son, Thomas Arthur Holland-Hibbert (born 1992)

References

Sources

Kidd, Charles, Williamson, David (editors). Debrett's Peerage and Baronetage (1990 edition). New York: St Martin's Press, 1990.

External links

Viscountcies in the Peerage of the United Kingdom
Noble titles created in 1895
Noble titles created for UK MPs
Knutsford